Doddington Hall is a country house in Doddington Park in the civil parish of Doddington, Cheshire, England.  It is recorded in the National Heritage List for England as a designated Grade I listed building.  The house was built for Rev Sir Thomas Broughton between 1777 and 1798 to a design by Samuel Wyatt.  It was built to replace an older house, of which Delves Hall was a part, a short distance to the north.  The house is constructed of Keuper sandstone ashlar with a slate roof and lead flashings in three storeys. It is in neoclassical style with an entrance front of nine bays.

It is the seat of the Broughton baronets.

See also

Jock Delves Broughton (born at Doddington Hall)
Grade I listed buildings in Cheshire East
Listed buildings in Doddington, Cheshire

References

External links
Doddington Estate - official website
Historic England Entry
Doddington Hall,  Cheshire, England, Historical Society of Pennsylvania

Houses completed in 1798
Grade I listed buildings in Cheshire
Country houses in Cheshire
Grade I listed houses
Neoclassical architecture in England